The Off-Peak Return is a type of train ticket used on National Rail services in Great Britain. The ticket was introduced as the Saver Return by British Rail in 1985, being rebranded to its current name on 7 September 2008.

Variants 

The Off-Peak Return is complemented by various sister products, with the full range comprising:

Validity 

The outward journey must be made on the date shown on the ticket, and the return journey can be made at any time within one calendar month from this date. 

As the name implies, the ticket is generally intended for use outside peak times. Typically train operating companies prevent use of this type of ticket during key commuting hours of weekday mornings and early evening, especially for services beginning or terminating in London, at which times higher fares may be charged. 

The times at which an Off-Peak fare is valid are set by the relevant train operator according to various factors, from levels of peak demand on the route in question to revenue maximisation. The specific details are given by referring to the two-digit 'validity code' assigned to the fare. The simplest apply a simple blanket time period to both outward and return journeys; more complex validity codes may apply different restrictions to outward and return journeys, or combine general validity periods with train-specific exemptions or exclusions.

Passengers are entitled to pause and resume their journey at any point and any number of times unless the ticket's validity code specifically prohibits this.

Validity examples

Misuse 
On routes where the chance of there being a ticket inspector is low, commuters have been known to buy one off-peak return in each direction and keep reusing the return portion until either the ticket gets inspected and stamped, or the month expires. The gradual introduction of ticket barriers across stations is removing this misuse as the ticket is retained by the barrier upon completing the journey.

References 

Passenger rail transport in the United Kingdom